Dragan Skočić (born 3 September 1968) is a Croatian professional football manager and former player.

Prior to his coaching career, Skočić started his playing career with the local club Rijeka and then abroad when he signed for Las Palmas in Spain.

Playing career
Skočić, a midfielder, played professional club football in Croatia for Rijeka and NK Novalja, in Spain for Las Palmas and Compostela, and in the UAE for Al-Ittihad Kalba. He was the first player from the Croatian football league who went abroad to play professionally.

Coaching career

Early career
After his playing career, Skočić went on to complete the Football Academy at the Croatian Football Academy and the Coach Education and Training Department at the Zagreb Faculty of Kinesiology, receiving an UEFA-PRO Coach diploma and a Professional Bachelor of the Coaching Profession.

Rijeka
He became manager of his hometown club, Rijeka, in 2005. Skočić secured one trophy for the club, winning the Croatian Cup for the 2005–06 season.

Interblock Ljubljana

In 2007, he became the head coach of the Slovenian club Interblock Ljubljana, while the club was in a difficult situation on the league scale. Only two years after the club was founded and under the management of Skočić, the club achieved outstanding results in the Slovenian PrvaLiga. Not only did they manage to stay in the first league, but they also won two trophies in the 2007–08 season, the Slovenian Cup and a Super Cup.

Al Arabi
Skočić took a year long sabbatical from coaching following his time at Interblock, and in the 2009–10 season, he took over the management of the Al-Arabi club in Kuwait. Under his leadership as head coach, the club played in two finals, the Crown Prince Cup and the Federation Cup. Also under Skočić, Al-Arabi played in the AFC Cup quarter-finals.

Al Nassr
Following Kuwait, in the 2010–11 season, Skočić was engaged by the Al Nassr football club from Riyadh, Saudi Arabia, one of the most prominent football clubs in the Arab world. Under Skočić, Al Nassr qualified for the third round of the AFC Champions League, after having played a successful season of competitions within the group. On 25 May 2011, he was sacked after a disappointing 4–1 loss to 2010 AFC Champions League finalists Zob Ahan, and was replaced by Portuguese boss Eurico Gomes.

Return to Rijeka
In March 2012 Skočić returned to take over the management of his hometown club Rijeka by replacing Ivo Ištuk as head coach, and became the third coach to take charge of the club in the 2011–12 Prva HNL season. Skočić inherited a defensively frail side that was 2 points off the relegation zone and was tasked with saving the team from relegation. Upon a 2-0 defeat to Cibalia, the club fell to the 12th place in the league. After just 43 days in charge, Skočić was relieved of his position, following a series of poor results, and was replaced by his assistant, Mladen Ivančić.

Malavan
On 26 May 2013, Skočić was announced as  head coach of Malavan for the upcoming season. He signed a two year contract with the club. He led the club to the seventh place, their best league finish since 2005.

Foolad

On 23 May 2014, Skočić was named as new head coach of Iran Pro League title-holders Foolad, on a one-year contract, replacing Hossein Faraki who resigned on the following day. In May 2015, Skočić received the award for coach of the month and signed a two-year contract extension to keep him at the club until July 2017. In November 2015 after poor scores with the club, Skočić was linked with the vacant head coach position at Sepahan F.C. but the job went to his compatriot, Igor Štimac. After an unsuccessful transfer to Sepahan, he remained as Foolad's head coach according to his contract. He left the club on 1 June 2016.

Khooneh be Khooneh Babol
On 16 January 2018 he became manager of F.C. Khooneh be Khooneh (Rayka Babol) replacing formerly resigned Javad Nekounam. He soon went on a streak by getting 13 points out of his first 5 games and also leading the second tier team into Hazfi Cup's final.

Sanat Naft
In July 2019 he became manager of Sanat Naft.

Iran national team
On 6 February 2020, Skočić was named  head coach of the Iran national team. He managed to take Iran to the 2022 World Cup as the winner of Group A by scoring 25 points out of 10 matches in the third round of the World Cup qualifiers and set the best performance of the Iran national football team in the World Cup qualifiers.

He was replaced as the Iranian national team manager on 7 September 2022.

Career statistics

Managerial statistics

Honours

Player
Las Palmas
Segunda División B: 1992–93

Compostela
Segunda División: 1993–94

Manager
Rijeka
Croatian Cup: 2005–06

Interblock Ljubljana
Slovenian Cup: 2007–08	
Slovenian Supercup: 2008

Khoone be Khoone
Hazfi Cup Runner-up: 2017–18

References

External links
 

1968 births
Living people
Footballers from Rijeka
Association football midfielders
Yugoslav footballers
Croatian footballers
HNK Rijeka players
UD Las Palmas players
SD Compostela footballers
NK Novalja players
Al-Ittihad Kalba SC players
Yugoslav First League players
Segunda División players
Segunda División B players
La Liga players
Croatian Football League players
UAE Pro League players
Croatian expatriate footballers
Expatriate footballers in Spain
Croatian expatriate sportspeople in Spain
Expatriate footballers in the United Arab Emirates
Croatian expatriate sportspeople in the United Arab Emirates
Croatian football managers
HNK Rijeka managers
NK IB 1975 Ljubljana managers
Al-Arabi SC (Kuwait) managers
Al Nassr FC managers
Malavan F.C. managers
Foolad F.C. managers
Sanat Naft Abadan F.C. managers
Iran national football team managers
Kuwait Premier League managers
Saudi Professional League managers
Persian Gulf Pro League managers
Croatian expatriate football managers
Croatian expatriate sportspeople in Slovenia
Expatriate football managers in Slovenia
Croatian expatriate sportspeople in Kuwait
Expatriate football managers in Kuwait
Croatian expatriate sportspeople in Iran
Expatriate football managers in Iran
Croatian expatriate sportspeople in Saudi Arabia
Expatriate football managers in Saudi Arabia